Leucapamea is a genus of moths of the family Noctuidae.

Species
 Leucapamea askoldis (Oberthür, 1880)
 Leucapamea chienmingfui Ronkay & Ronkay, 1999
 Leucapamea formosensis (Hampson, 1910)
 Leucapamea hikosana (Sugi, 1958)
 Leucapamea kawadai (Sugi, 1955)
 Leucapamea kyushuensis (Sugi, 1958)
 Leucapamea tsueyluana Chang, 1991

References
Natural History Museum Lepidoptera genus database
Leucapamea at funet

Hadeninae